Guangzhou Korean School is a South Korean international school in , Panyu District, Guangzhou.

Kim Jang-hwan, South Korea's consul general in Guangzhou, announced the opening of a Korean international school in Guangzhou in 2011. Because Panyu District was densely populated with Koreans, the school was planned to be located there. The Chinese Ministry of Education approved the school as a school for teaching foreigners on July 24, 2013.

Location

It was formerly located within the within the Jinxiuxiangjiang Primary School in Jinxiuxiangjiang Apartment in Nancun Town, Panyu District. At a later time it was located in Asian Games City (亚运城), Shilou Town.

See also
 Koreans in China

Notes

References

External links
 Guangzhou Korean School 

International schools in Guangzhou
Korean international schools in China
Private schools in Guangdong